Piet Spel (18 April 1924 – 9 March 2007) was a Dutch footballer. He played in one match for the Netherlands national football team in 1948.

References

External links
 

1924 births
2007 deaths
Dutch footballers
Netherlands international footballers
Place of birth missing
Association footballers not categorized by position